Jocelyn Wildenstein (née Jocelyne Périsset; born August 5, 1940) is a Swiss socialite known for her extensive cosmetic surgery, resulting in her catlike appearance; her 1999 high-profile divorce from billionaire art dealer and businessman Alec Wildenstein; and her extravagant lifestyle and subsequent bankruptcy filing.

Early life and relationships
Jocelyn Périsset was born in Lausanne, Switzerland on September 7, 1940. Her father worked in a sporting goods store. She began dating Swiss Cyril Piguet, producer of the 1964 film Un commerce tranquille, at the age of 17. She later lived in Paris with Italian French filmmaker Sergio Gobbi. While there, she became a skilled hunter and pilot.

Périsset was introduced to Alec N. Wildenstein, of the wealthy family of renowned art dealers, by Saudi arms dealer Adnan Khashoggi at a shooting weekend at the Wildenstein African ranch "Ol Jogi" in 1977. Périsset and Wildenstein eloped to Las Vegas on 30 April 1978 and had two children together. There were suspicions that she may have been a prostitute before meeting Wildenstein, but it has never been proven ("Really? Well, they have to try to find something against me").

The Wildensteins' divorce in 1999 was not amicable. Jocelyn walked in on her husband and a 19-year-old Russian model in her bedroom at the Wildenstein New York home, and he threatened her with a gun. This resulted in a night in jail for Alec Wildenstein. The presiding judge, Marilyn Diamond, received death threats in the mail during the proceedings.  During her divorce, the judge stipulated that she could not use any alimony payments for further cosmetic surgery. Jocelyn enlisted the services of Ed Rollins for public relations assistance and at various times both Bernard Clair and Kenneth Godt for legal counsel.

Wildenstein began dating fashion designer Lloyd Klein in 2003. Following highly publicized domestic incidents, the couple split in 2016.

Cosmetic surgery
Wildenstein has had extensive cosmetic surgeries to her face. Her catlike appearance has led media outlets to nickname her "Catwoman", "The Lion Queen", and "The Bride of Wildenstein". She denies having excessive plastic surgery, citing her Swiss heritage, but admitted to a multi-million dollar surgery to make her eyes more cat-like she did with her husband.

According to Alec Wildenstein, "She was thinking that she could fix her face like a piece of furniture. Skin does not work that way. But she wouldn’t listen".

Finances
Wildenstein is known for her extravagant life. She once calculated her yearly telephone bill at $60,000 and food and wine costs at $547,000.

Wildenstein received $2.5 billion in her divorce settlement and $100 million each year for the following 13 years. The judge stipulated that she could not use any alimony payments for further cosmetic surgery.

Following her divorce, Wildenstein sold the marital home in New York to real estate developer Janna Bullock for $13 million.

In 2018, she filed for bankruptcy.

References

Bibliography – books

Bibliography – periodicals

 

Swiss women in business
Socialites
Living people
1940 births
Swiss expatriates in the United States
Jocelyn
People from Lausanne
Former billionaires
People known for their body modification
20th-century Swiss women
21st-century Swiss women